AbsolutePunk was a website, online community, and alternative music news source founded by Jason Tate (the most recent CEO). The website mainly focused on artists who are relatively unknown to mainstream audiences, but it was known to feature artists who have eventually achieved crossover success, including Blink-182, Fall Out Boy, My Chemical Romance, New Found Glory, Brand New, Taking Back Sunday, The Gaslight Anthem, Anberlin, Thrice, All Time Low, Jack's Mannequin, Yellowcard, Paramore, Relient K, and A Day to Remember. The primary musical genres of focus were emo and pop punk, but other genres were included.

On March 31, 2016, it was announced that founder Jason Tate would be re-acquiring AbsolutePunk from SpinMedia (the parent company of Buzznet) and the website would be shuttered and folded into Tate's new music and social platform, Chorus.fm. The very next day on April 1,  all of the domain names and social media accounts associated with AbsolutePunk were being redirected to Chorus.fm.

Website 
Founded June 6, 2000 by Jason Tate, the website focused on music industry news, and included album reviews, interviews, articles, journals and photo galleries. The site also allowed user interaction via a vBulletin Internet Forum system; users could register their own personalized account, create a profile, and comment on nearly every portion of the site. Special accounts were afforded to industry figures (such as record label representatives) and band members denoting them as such, with threads often created specifically to allow users to interact with them.

The website originally started as a Blink-182/MxPx fan site. In 2005, the site was drawing six million hits daily. By 2006, the website was noted for engaging teenagers, and was beginning to chip away at the dominance of MySpace, according to OMMA online media magazine.

The social media network Buzznet purchased AbsolutePunk in May 2008. AbsolutePunks community included over 500,000 music fans, making it one of the largest alternative music zines on the Internet.

The site was essentially run by contributor-turned-moderators who worked for the site but were not paid. They added news posts, wrote reviews and conducted interviews all in their free time.

Content
Even though it lost some content because of numerous server switches over the years, AbsolutePunk still featured over 55,000 news articles, 2500 reviews, 500 interviews, and 52,000 files in its multimedia gallery. ABSOLUTExclusives (content exclusive to the website) and recent album reviews were often displayed prominently at the top of the site's news feed, while other stories were simply listed in descending chronological order. The staff conducted frequent interviews with bands and often asked the AbsolutePunk community to contribute questions in advance. They also ran numerous contests via both an opt-in lottery system and through news items, with the latter usually awarding prizes to the users who replied the fastest while meeting certain criteria [such as being able to provide their own transportation to a concert venue].

Forums
One of AbsolutePunks main purposes was to connect music fans with one another through its extensive online forums. The forums featured over 318,500 registered members. They were divided into a number of different sections, split into categories such as entertainment, sports, politics, and education. Users were encouraged to contribute their own media to the site, such as album reviews and news submissions. As most of the site functioned on the same bulletin board system, forum activity would often spill out into album reviews and news stories as well.

Accomplishments
The website gained a strong following in the alternative music scene over the years, allowing it to sponsor various tours and host or premiere exclusive content from many bands. In the August 2007 issue of Blender, owner Jason Tate was named #18 in their list of Top 25 "Most Influential People in Online Music".

On June 1, 2005 vocalist and pianist Andrew McMahon of the bands Something Corporate and Jack's Mannequin was diagnosed with leukemia. AbsolutePunk raised approximately $16,400 for the Leukemia Research Foundation by selling over 6,000 orange gel bracelets online. The wristbands read "I Will Fight" in reference to a well-known song ("Watch the Sky") by Something Corporate.

References

External links
AbsolutePunk

American music websites
Internet properties established in 2000
Internet properties disestablished in 2016
Defunct American websites